Saddle Mountain Roundup is a 1941 American Western film directed by S. Roy Luby. The film is the ninth in Monogram Pictures' "Range Busters" series, and it stars Ray "Crash" Corrigan as Crash, John "Dusty" King as Dusty and Max "Alibi" Terhune as Alibi, with Lita Conway, Jack Mulhall and Willie Fung.

Plot summary

Cast 
 Ray Corrigan as Crash Corrigan
 John 'Dusty' King as Dusty King
 Max Terhune as Alibi Terhune
 Lita Conway as Nancy Henderson
 Jack Mulhall as Dan Freeman (lawyer)
 Willie Fung as Fang Way
 John Elliott as 'Magpie' Harper
 George Chesebro as Foreman Blackie Stone
 Jack Holmes as Sheriff
 Steve Clark as Jack Henderson
 Carl Mathews as Bill (henchman at shack)
 Elmer as Elmer, Alibi's Dummy
 Harold Goodman as Cousin Harold (singing / comic ranch hand)

Soundtrack

See also
The Range Busters series:

 The Range Busters (1940)
 Trailing Double Trouble (1940)
 West of Pinto Basin (1940)
 Trail of the Silver Spurs (1941)
 The Kid's Last Ride (1941)
 Tumbledown Ranch in Arizona (1941)
 Wrangler's Roost (1941)
 Fugitive Valley (1941)
 Saddle Mountain Roundup (1941)
 Tonto Basin Outlaws (1941)
 Underground Rustlers (1941)
 Thunder River Feud (1942)
 Rock River Renegades (1942)
 Boot Hill Bandits (1942)
 Texas Trouble Shooters (1942)
 Arizona Stage Coach (1942)
 Texas to Bataan (1942)
 Trail Riders (1942)
 Two Fisted Justice (1943)
 Haunted Ranch (1943)
 Land of Hunted Men (1943)
 Cowboy Commandos (1943)
 Black Market Rustlers (1943)
 Bullets and Saddles (1943)

External links 
 
 

1941 films
1941 Western (genre) films
American black-and-white films
American Western (genre) films
1940s English-language films
Films directed by S. Roy Luby
Monogram Pictures films
Range Busters
1940s American films